Sir David Davis (1859 – 11 June 1938) served as the first Jewish lord mayor of Birmingham, England for two terms, from 1921–1923, and served for a time as the Justice of the Peace. He was on the Birmingham City Council from 1901 to 1924.

Davis was knighted in 1923.

References

1859 births
1938 deaths
Lord Mayors of Birmingham, West Midlands
English Jews
Jewish British politicians